Anders Jan Ove Jansson (born 26 January 1968) is a Swedish former professional footballer who played as a midfielder. At the club level he represented Kalmar FF, Östers IF, IFK Norrköping, and Port Vale between 1985 and 2001. He won seven caps for the Sweden national team between 1991 and 1994, and was a squad member for his country at UEFA Euro 1992.

Club career

Kalmar FF 
Jansson began his senior career at Kalmar FF, and played 11 games in the Allsvenskan in 1985, as the "Red brothers" finished second, just two points behind champions Malmö. He then featured 17 times in 1986, as the club slipped down the table and ended the season in the relegation zone. They suffered a second successive relegation zone in 1987, and dropped out of Division 1 Södra, despite Jansson scoring three goals in 16 games.

Östers IF 
Jansson moved back to the top-flight with Östers, and scored two goals in 20 league games in 1988 as the club was relegated into Division 1. New manager Hans Backe then led Östers to the Division 1 Södra title in 1989, with Jansson scoring 14 goals in 26 appearances. He then scored five goals in 22 games in 1990, as the team secured European football with a fourth-place finish. He then scored 13 goals in 31 appearances in 1991, and also scored a goal against Olympique Lyonnais in the UEFA Cup. He went on to score eight goals in 28 games in 1992, as Östers finished second in the league, seven points behind champions Norrköping.

IFK Norrköping 
He moved on to league champions Norrköping, and scored eight goals in 23 games as they finished second in the league in 1993, some five points behind champions Göteborg. He played 19 games without finding the net in 1994, as Norrköping finished in fourth place. He featured 25 times in 1995, as they had to beat GAIS over two legs after finishing in the relegation play-off zone. He scored one goal in six games in 1996, as Norrköping finished in eighth place.

Loan to Port Vale 
He moved to England with First Division side Port Vale on a three-month loan in November 1996, during the Swedish winter break. He played 11 league games in the 1996–97 season, and scored his first goal in the Football League at Vale Park on 19 January, in a 4–4 draw with Queens Park Rangers. Back with Norrköping, he scored two goals in nine games in the 1997 season.

Port Vale 
Port Vale manager John Rudge signed him permanently during the summer of 1997 for a £200,000 fee. He scored five goals in 32 league and two League Cup appearances in the 1997–98 season, the last two of which helped to secure a 4–0 win over Huddersfield Town at the Alfred McAlpine Stadium on the final day of the season – the victory kept the "Valiants" out of the relegation zone. Jansson said that "That’s the first time in my career that I haven’t been able to sleep before a game. In Sweden you play almost for fun, but here this is my work and it was important we stayed up." However, he featured just eight times in the 1998–99 season before being released by new manager Brian Horton in February.

Return to IFK Norrköping 
Jansson returned to Sweden and to former club Norrkoping to make four appearances in 1999. He then played five games in 2000 and six games in 2001, before retiring from Nya Parken.

International career
Jansson was a part of the Sweden U21 team that reached the semi-finals of the 1990 UEFA European Under-21 Championship. He won seven caps for the senior Sweden team between 1991 and 1994 and represented his country at UEFA Euro 1992 and the Joe Robbie Cup.

Style of play
Jansson was a cultured midfielder and a dead ball specialist.

Career statistics

Club

International
Appearances and goals by national team and year

Honours
Östers
Swedish Football Division 1 Södra: 1989

References

External links
 
 

1968 births
Living people
People from Öland
Swedish footballers
Sweden international footballers
Association football midfielders
Kalmar FF players
Östers IF players
IFK Norrköping players
Swedish expatriate footballers
Expatriate footballers in England
Port Vale F.C. players
Allsvenskan players
English Football League players
UEFA Euro 1992 players